Maybrit Illner (née Klose; born 12 January 1965) is a German journalist and television presenter.

Education 
Born in East Berlin, Illner went to school in the Friedrichshain area of Berlin and studied journalism at the University of Leipzig from 1984 to 1988. She joined the SED in 1986 and left it in 1991.

Career 
After university, Illner worked as a television journalist at Deutscher Fernsehfunk, East German state television, until it was dissolved in 1991. She joined German broadcaster ZDF and co-presented Morgenmagazin, a weekday morning show from 1992. She became the head of the Morgenmagazin in 1998.

From October 1999, Illner presented an evening talk show originally titled Berlin Mitte but changed in March 2007 to Maybrit Illner. Besides, she moderated the TV election debates between Chancellor Gerhard Schröder and his challengers Edmund Stoiber (2002) and Angela Merkel (2005). In 2006, she interviewed President of Russia Vladimir Putin. She also interviewed Merkel shortly before the 2009 elections.

As successor to Steffen Seibert, Illner anchored ZDF's news show heute-journal from September 2010 until December 2012, in rotation with Claus Kleber and Marietta Slomka.

Since 2013, Illner has been focusing on her own political talkshow Maybrit Illner. Alongside Anne Will, Peter Kloeppel and Stefan Raab, she also moderated the only TV election debate between incumbent Merkel and her competitor Peer Steinbrück ahead of the 2013 elections, which was aired live on four of Germany's most-watched television channels during prime-time. Ahead of the 2017 elections, she moderated the debate between Merkel and Martin Schulz, this time with Kloeppel, Sandra Maischberger and Claus Strunz. Alongside Oliver Köhr, she most recently moderated one of three TV election debates between the three candidates to succeed Merkel – Annalena Baerbock, Armin Laschet and Olaf Scholz – ahead of the 2021 elections. In March 2022, she conducted the first major televised interview with Scholz as newly elected Chancellor; a second one followed in March 2023.

Personal life 

She was married to fellow television journalist Michael Illner (born 1962) from 1988 to 2007. She married René Obermann, at that time CEO of Deutsche Telekom, on 14 August 2010 at Schloss Ulrichshusen. They live in Berlin and Bonn.

For the German Red Cross (DRK), Illner has travelled to Iraq in 2003 and Pakistan in 2004. In 2018, she chaired the jury for the annual Ludwig-Börne-Preis, which awarded the prize to journalist Souad Mekhennet.

Awards 
 2000: Hanns-Joachim-Friedrichs-Award for critical and independent television journalism
 2001: Hans-Klein-Media Award for their moderation of the ZDF talk show  Berlin Mitte 
 2002 and 2007: Bambi
 2003: Bayerischer Fernsehpreis
 2004: German Television Award for Best Information Programme
 2006: Hildegard von Bingen Prize for Journalism (according to the prize jury Illner understood transforming "the Anglo-Saxon form of information, Talk in a separate and unique media event")
 2009: Goldene Kamera in the category Best Information

Publications 
 Frauen an der Macht. 21 einflussreiche Frauen berichten aus der Wirklichkeit. Hugendubel, Kreuzlingen, München 2005, .
 Politiker-Deutsch/Deutsch-Politiker. Langenscheidt, München, Berlin 2007, .
 (with Ingke Brodersen) Ente auf Sendung. Von Medien und ihren Machern. Deutsche Verlags Anstalt, München 2003, .

References

External links 

ZDF: Maybrit Illner
Maybrit Illner Zeit interview
Talkshow-king Oskar Lafontaine by Lukas Hermsmeier on Cicero Online, 23. January 2009
»Politics demands dedication« Interview by Christoph Amend, Die Zeit, 5. July 2006

FemBio|http://www.fembio.org/biographie.php/frau/biographie/maybrit-illner/

German women television presenters
German television presenters
German television talk show hosts
German broadcast news analysts
German television journalists
21st-century German journalists
1965 births
Living people
German women television journalists
Leipzig University alumni
ZDF people
People from Friedrichshain-Kreuzberg
21st-century German women